Meibion Glyndŵr (Sons of Glyndŵr) was a group linked to arson of English-owned holiday homes in Wales.

They were formed in response to the housing crisis in Wales precipitated by large numbers of houses being bought by wealthy English people for use as holiday homes, pushing up house prices beyond the means of many locals. They were responsible for setting fire to English-owned holiday homes in Wales from 1979 to the mid-1990s.

History 
The group first came to prominence in 1979 after the Welsh devolution referendum. In the first wave of attacks, eight English-owned holiday homes were destroyed within the space of a month. In 1980, Welsh Police carried out a series of raids in Operation Tân in an effort to find the culprits. As part of the operation, Welsh nationalist and publisher Robat Gruffud and his wife, Enid, were arrested and interrogated. The police were not able to find any evidence of their involvement in the arson and released the Gruffuds who were also compensated for their time. Within the next ten years around 220 properties were damaged by the campaign. It peaked in the late 1980s with the targeting of Conservative MPs' homes with letter bombs, most notably David Hunt, the then Welsh secretary, who was targeted in 1990.

Four separate movements claimed responsibility for the bombings: Mudiad Amddiffyn Cymru ("the movement to defend Wales"), Cadwyr Cymru ("the keepers of Wales"), Meibion Glyndŵr, and the Welsh Army for the Workers Republic (WAWR), whose attacks were on political targets in the early 1980s. Meibion Glyndŵr was the only group to have any claim to long-term success, although since the mid-1990s the group has been inactive, and Welsh nationalist violence has ceased, at least on an organisational level. Letters claiming responsibility for attacks were signed "Rhys Gethin", in homage to one of Owain Glyndŵr's most prominent followers.

A reinvestigation into postal bombings led to the conviction of Sion Aubrey Roberts in 1993. Roberts was sentenced to 12 years but was released after serving 8 years. He has maintained his innocence while expressing sympathy for Meibion Glyndŵr's cause. A Plaid Cymru member of parliament, Elfyn Llwyd, speculated that the group was an MI5 front.

Activities 
 1979–94: Meibion Glyndŵr fire-bomb around 220 English-owned homes.
 1988–89: Meibion Glyndŵr declared that "every white settler is a target". The group also placed incendiary bombs in Conservative party offices in London and estate agents' offices in London, Liverpool, Sutton Coldfield, Haverfordwest, Carmarthen and Llandeilo.
 1990: Poet and Anglican priest R. S. Thomas calls for a campaign to deface English-owned homes.
 1993: Sion Aubrey Roberts, a member of Meibion Glyndŵr, was jailed for twelve years for sending letter bombs to Conservative politicians.

Books 
 Mae rhywun yn gwybod (Somebody Knows) by Alwyn Gruffydd (Gwasg Carreg Gwalch, 2004).
 To Dream of Freedom by Roy Clews, 3rd edition, (Y Lolfa, 2004). Concentrates on MAC and the Free Wales Army in the 1960s. Includes interviews by participants.
 Freedom Fighters: Wales's Forgotten War 1963–1993, John Humphries (University of Wales Press, 2008). Looks at FWA, MAC and Meibion Glyndwr with many interviews and historical facts.
 Dr Wyn Thomas (y Lolfa, 2019) John Jenkins: The Reluctant Revolutionary? Hardback: ; Paperback: 
 Wyn Thomas (2013) Hands Off Wales

See also 
 Welsh independence
 Welsh nationalism
 Anti-English sentiment

References

External links 
 Article in Welsh from the BBC
 Thirty years since the first Welsh holiday home arson
 Arson campaign, 30 years on
 Meibion Glyndwr: Home Office papers released about holiday home attacks
 Shadow of Ulster in the Welsh Valleys

Anti-English sentiment
Arson in the United Kingdom
Cultural depictions of Owain Glyndŵr
Housing rights activism
Paramilitary organisations based in the United Kingdom
Nationalist terrorism in Europe
Terrorism in Wales
Welsh nationalism